Selwyns Travel is a coach tour operator based in Runcorn, England.

Selwyns Travel was founded in 1968 by Robert Alun Jones. It grew with the purchase of Yates Tours in 1979, the Manchester Airport division of Ambassador Coaches t/a Starline Travel in 1994, Hardings Tours, Liverpool in 1996 and Haytons, Manchester in 2011.

In March 2013, the business was sold to the RATP Group with a fleet of 90 vehicles operating from depots in Runcorn, Manchester and St Helens.

In April 2020 RATP returned control back to Selwyn Jones through his newly incorporated private company, Selwyns Coaches Limited which became the major shareholder of Selwyns Travel Limited.

Selwyns operate from 3 depots in the North West as well as a National Express outstation based at Leeds Coach Station

Their Head Office depot in Runcorn, which covers Private Hire bookings, Various College contracts including Sir John Deanes College and Reaseheath College and the Liverpool Hope University to Liverpool South Parkway shuttle and some National Express routes.

The Sharston depot in Manchester which is responsible for Selwyns Airside operations at Manchester Airport and also some National Express routes operate from this depot

The Prenton Depot on the Wirral operates various school contracts on behalf of Wirral council

During the 2021 Go North West strike, Selwyns Travel was one of a number of bus operators who provided vehicles and drivers to operate services on behalf of Go North West along with Edwards Coaches and Midland Classic.

Footnotes

References

External links

Coach operators in England
RATP Group
Transport companies established in 1968
1968 establishments in England